Alex Cisar (born 5 April 2000) is a Slovenian biathlete. He is a two-time Biathlon Junior World champion in Pursuit and Sprint.

Biathlon results
All results are sourced from the International Biathlon Union.

Junior/Youth World Championships
5 medals (2 gold, 2 silver, 1 bronze)

References

2000 births
Living people
Slovenian male biathletes
People from Kranj
21st-century Slovenian people